The London, Midland and Scottish Railway (LMS) Royal Scot Class is a class of 4-6-0 express passenger locomotive introduced in 1927.  Originally having parallel boilers, all members were later rebuilt with tapered type 2A boilers, and were in effect two classes.

Background
Until the mid-1920s, the LMS had followed the Midland Railway's small engine policy, which meant that it had no locomotives of sufficient power for its expresses on the West Coast Main Line.

The Operating and Motive Power Departments of the LMS were satisfied with the small engine policy. However, in 1926 the Chief Mechanical Engineer, Henry Fowler, began the design of a compound Pacific express locomotive. The management of the LMS, faced with disagreement between the CME and the other departments, obtained a loan of a GWR Castle class locomotive, Launceston Castle, which was operated for one month between Euston and Carlisle.

Following the success of the Castle 4-6-0 in working on the LMS, a decision was taken to cancel Fowler's Pacific project, and to replace it with a 4-6-0 with three cylinders and a simple-expansion steam circuit. Because there was an urgent need for new express locomotives the LMS placed an order with the North British Locomotive Company of Glasgow for 50 engines. The North British, with its extensive drawing office and two works, possessed sufficient capacity to expedite the order within a year. The Derby drawing office and North British staff collaborated in designing the class, with the latter producing the working drawings. Fowler took little part in the design process, which was carried out by Herbert Chambers, Chief Draughtsman at Derby, and his staff. The LMS requested a set of drawings of the Castle class from the GWR, but did not receive them. Instead a set of drawings of the SR Lord Nelson Class were obtained, and used for the design of the firebox. The main features of the design followed existing Derby practice, with the cylinders and valve gear being derived from the Fowler 2-6-4T, also being designed at Derby at that time.

They were introduced without testing. Radford claims that the boiler owed much to the MR 0-10-0 Lickey Banker 'Big Bertha'.  A further 20 were built by Derby Works.

They were initially named after regiments of the British Army, and after historical LNWR locomotives. Those with LNWR names were renamed in 1935 and 1936 with more names of regiments.

From late 1931, after several forms of smoke deflectors were tried on various locomotives to stop drifting smoke obscuring the crew's forward vision, the straight sided smoke deflectors were added. These were later replaced by deflectors with angled top. From 1933 the class was taken off the top-link expresses, being superseded by the LMS Princess Royal Class and later the LMS Coronation Class pacifics.

North American tour
In 1933, the LMS was invited to send a locomotive and train to the Century of Progress International Exposition in Chicago, USA. It was decided to send an engine of the Royal Scot class, and one was selected that was due for general overhaul. The identity of this locomotive is generally regarded as having been No. 6152 "The Kings Dragoon Guardsman". The coupled axleboxes were replaced with larger ones, based on a GWR design, and the bogie replaced by a De Glehn type, also derived from GWR practice. Springs and spring rigging were also updated, and the boiler replaced. The rebuilt locomotive assumed the identity of 6100 The Royal Scot with (on its return from the USA) an enlarged nameplate with details of its appearance at the exhibition. It retained this identity after its return from the USA.

Fury
LMS 6399 Fury, built in 1929, was an unsuccessful experimental prototype locomotive with a high-pressure, water tube boiler and compound 3-cylinder drive, based on the Royal Scot. It was rebuilt by William Stanier in 1935 with a Type 2 conventional boiler to become 6170 British Legion.  This served as the blueprint for later rebuilding, but always remained a one-off.

Rebuilding

 
In 1942 the LMS rebuilt two LMS Jubilee Class locomotives with Type 2A boilers, but later turned to the parallel-boilered Royal Scots whose boilers and cylinders were life-expired, and whose smokeboxes were difficult to keep airtight. Between 1943 and 1955 the whole class was rebuilt to create the LMS Rebuilt Royal Scot Class. The rebuilds were quite substantial, requiring new boiler, frames and cylinders, but in most cases the original frame stretchers, wheels, cab and fittings were retained. The usual procedure was that as each locomotive arrived for rebuilding, it was stripped and the identity transferred to a fresh frameset prepared using the parts recovered from the locomotive that had previously been rebuilt. The new frames were slightly shorter than the originals. Thus, most rebuilt examples retained their own cab, wheels etc., but most of the frame stretchers, and other integral parts of the frame were from the previously rebuilt loco.

The new 'Rebuilt Scot' design was carried out under the auspices of William Stanier, who was then engaged on war work, so was actually undertaken by George Ivatt and E.S. Cox. Initially these too were built without smoke deflectors but later acquired them.

Accidents and incidents

On 30 September 1945, at the Bourne End rail crash, 6157 The Royal Artilleryman was hauling an express passenger train which was derailed at Bourne End, Hertfordshire due to excessive speed through a set of points. Forty-three people were killed and 64 were injured.

Details
Note: Date built refers to the 'LMS build date'.

Preservation
No original Royal Scots in 'as built' condition survive, as all were rebuilt by 1955. However, two of the rebuilt locomotives have been preserved as LMS Rebuilt Royal Scot Class examples.

In fiction
 No. 6115 Scots Guardsman featured in the 1936 film Night Mail along with No. 6108 Seaforth Highlander, the latter being cleaned at an unknown shed.
46126 Royal Army Service Corps featured in the 1949 film Train of Events.

Models
Models to 00 scale of the Royal Scot in both unrebuilt and rebuilt forms have been produced by several manufacturers, and each has been available in several liveries with a variety of numbers and names. Mainline (Palitoy) introduced a model of the rebuilt locomotives in 1977 and they were followed by Airfix who introduced their own version in 1978, but after the Airfix range was incorporated into the Mainline range, the ex-Airfix model was dropped. In unrebuilt form, G & R Wrenn introduced a model in 1980; and Mainline introduced their own version in 1982. Bachmann took over the tooling for both of the Mainline locomotives, and did do several production runs, with the ultimate intention of re-tooling the design to upgrade it to modern standards and detailing, but unfortunately for them, Hornby beat them to it.

Hornby produced their own Rebuilt Scots, these being introduced in 2007, along with the rebuilt patriot locomotives. Rivarossi (now part of Hornby) made a similar model of the No. 6100 in an intermediate 1:80 scale (approx. 3.8 mm/ft) between HO & OO in 1977 based on the original unrebuilt form in LMS livery.  It also made another model of the No. 6140 "Hector" sister engine.

Graham Farish released a British N gauge model in 2009, in LMS Black, and BR Brunswick Green liveries.

Comet Models produce a 4 mm kit in brass and white metal for the rebuilt Scot. Wills produced an original version kit in whitemetal which Southeastern Finecast have revised this kit and added an etched chassis. Eames/Jamieson produced a rebuilt version using nickel silver for the superstructure.

Brassmasters did a limited edition kit in 4 mm.

The erstwhile Kitmaster company produced an unpowered polystyrene injection moulded model kit for TT gauge. In late 1962, the Kitmaster brand was sold by its parent company (Rosebud Dolls) to Airfix. It is thought that the moulds for this locomotive were amongst those lost or destroyed at about this time or before. As a result, unmade examples of this kit exchange hands between collectors for considerable sums.

References

Sources

 

 

 
7 Royal Scot
NBL locomotives
4-6-0 locomotives
Railway locomotives introduced in 1927
Standard gauge steam locomotives of Great Britain
2′C h3 locomotives
Passenger locomotives